Spain competed at the 2022 Winter Paralympics in Beijing, China which took place between 4–13 March 2022.

Competitors
The following is the list of number of competitors participating at the Games per sport/discipline.

Cross-country skiing

One skier competed in cross-country skiing.

Standing cross-country

Snowboarding

One snowboarder qualified to compete in snowboarding.

Snowboard cross

See also
Spain at the Paralympics
Spain at the 2022 Winter Olympics

References

Nations at the 2022 Winter Paralympics
2022
Winter Paralympics